The 7th Connecticut Regiment was raised on September 16, 1776, at New Milford, Connecticut. The regiment would see action in the Battle of Brandywine, Battle of Germantown and the Battle of Monmouth. The regiment was merged into the 5th Connecticut Regiment on January 1, 1781, at West Point, New York and disbanded on November 15, 1783.

A Seventh Connecticut Volunteer Infantry Regiment served in the Union Army during the Civil War. Most of its enlistment was in the Department of the South, but after early 1864, it was transferred to Virginia to join the Army of the Potomac and the Army of the James. It finished the war in North Carolina.  Early in its history, it successfully invaded Tybee Island from the sea and captured Hilton Head in preparation of a landward assault on Charleston, South Carolina.  After a brief skirmish that saw it defeated by a superior rebel defense, no further assault was attempted by land. Faced with hardships due to the loss of its support ships to a storm and treacherous terrain, the regiment was transferred to engagements elsewhere.

The Seventh Connecticut Volunteer Infantry Regiment also served in the Battle of Olustee in Florida in a fight that had no effect on the outcome of the American Civil War.

External links
the Seventh Connecticut at the Battle of Olustee
Bibliography of Connecticut's participation in the Continental Army compiled by the United States Army Center of Military History

Connecticut regiments of the Continental Army
Military units and formations established in 1776
New Milford, Connecticut
Military units and formations disestablished in 1783